Rinca, also known as Rincah, Rindja, Rintja and Pintja, is a small island near Komodo and Flores island, East Nusa Tenggara, Indonesia, within the West Manggarai Regency. It is one of the three largest islands included in Komodo National Park. Rinca is also populated with many other species such as wild pigs, buffalos and many birds.

Area

Living conditions
Living conditions for local people on the island are often difficult. Education facilities, for example, are quite limited for children. Some non-government organisations help with the provision of books for children on Rinca. Local people must also take some care to avoid Komodo dragons because Komodos in the area occasionally attack and kill humans.

Sea conditions
Rinca and Komodo Islands bracket a north-south passage between the Indian Ocean and the Flores Sea. Due to the large bodies of water and narrow gap, the waters between Rinca and Komodo are subject to whirlpools and currents in excess of 10 knots.

Diving in the region requires care. In June 2008, five scuba divers (three British, one French and one Swedish) were found on the southern coast of Rinca after having been missing for 2 days. The group had drifted  from where their dive boat abandoned them. They survived on oysters and other shellfish.

Fauna
Being less known and less visited than Komodo Island, it is a good place to see the Komodo dragon in its natural environment with fewer people to disturb them. Day trips can be arranged to the Loh Buaya park facility on Rinca Island from Labuan Bajo on Flores by small boat at the park headquarters. A jetty which marks the entrance to the park facility. A short walk leads to the local park office where there are rangers to accompany visitors on short or medium-length walks to see komodos and other animals such as monkeys, deer and buffalos.

See also
Sape Strait

Gallery

References

Landforms of East Nusa Tenggara
Lesser Sunda Islands
Komodo National Park
Islands of the Indian Ocean
Populated places in Indonesia
Islands of Indonesia